Hitomi Kawabata (川畑瞳) is a Japanese softball player who plays as a infielder. She represented Japan at the 2020 Summer Olympics and won a gold medal.

Playing career
She participated in the  2016 Women's Softball World Championship.

References

External links 
 WBSC Women's Softball World Championship - Day 3

Living people
1996 births
Asian Games medalists in softball
Asian Games gold medalists for Japan
Japanese softball players
Medalists at the 2018 Asian Games
Medalists at the 2020 Summer Olympics
Olympic gold medalists for Japan
Olympic medalists in softball
Olympic softball players of Japan
Softball players at the 2018 Asian Games
Softball players at the 2020 Summer Olympics
Competitors at the 2022 World Games
World Games silver medalists
World Games medalists in softball
21st-century Japanese women